Tracy A. Henke, a native of Moscow Mills, Missouri, was a government official holding held high-level positions in the United States Department of Justice and the Department of Homeland Security. She currently serves as the legislative director for United States Senator Roy Blunt from the State of Missouri.

After earning a bachelor's degree in political science from the University of Missouri, Henke joined the Justice Department on June 25, 2001, as principal deputy assistant attorney general (PDAAG) of the Office of Justice Programs, eventually rising to deputy associate attorney general, and then continuing in that position while also being appointed acting assistant attorney general for OJP in January 2005.  Prior to serving at DOJ, she was senior policy advisor for U.S. Senator Christopher Bond of Missouri, and before that, she worked for Senator Jack Danforth.

On September 5, 2005, President George W. Bush nominated her to be the executive director of the Office of State and Local Government Coordination and Preparedness, Department of Homeland Security, and then recess appointed her to the position on January 4, 2006.

Contributions to the USA PATRIOT Act
The USA PATRIOT Act, passed in October 2001, removed a great deal of freedom from the directors of the Bureau of Justice Statistics and the National Institute of Justice giving their authority to the assistant attorney general for the Office of Justice Programs, a position to which Henke was Deputy, and then later filled herself.

"In a report to Congress on these changes, Ms. Daniels, whose brother, Mitchell E. Daniels, Jr., is director of the Office of Management and Budget, said there was a need to centralize control over these agencies because of the Sept. 11 attacks. Ms. Henke is a close associate of Mr. [John] Ashcroft and was responsible for inserting language in the USA PATRIOT Act undercutting the two agencies' independence, employees say."

The BJS Racial Profiling Report 
In April 2005, as a major report on traffic stops by police was being completed by Lawrence A. Greenfeld, whom President Bush had named in 2001 "to lead the Bureau of Justice Statistics, Mr. Greenfeld's office drafted a news release to announce the findings and submitted it for review to the office of Tracy A. Henke, who was then the acting assistant attorney general who oversaw the statistics branch.

The report showed, and the announcement summarized, that the rate at which whites, blacks and Hispanics were stopped was about the same, but that once stopped, black and Hispanic drivers were two to three times more likely to suffer a negative consequence, such as being searched, handcuffed, or arrested.  For the press release, Henke insisted that the first finding be included (that there was no apparent difference in the rate at which different ethnic groups were stopped), but that the second finding be excised (that there was a significant different in how different ethnic groups were treated once stopped).

The director, Larry Greenfeld, refused to make the changes.  "Shortly thereafter, Greenfeld was brought in for questioning by the third highest ranking official in the Justice Department and then called to the White House and asked to resign,"

Controversy at Homeland Security 
On May 31, 2006, Henke, who is in charge of Homeland Security's grant-making, announced plans to "cut counterterrorism money for New York City and the Washington area -- which together have been the targets of 100 percent of al-Qaeda's terrorist attacks on American soil -- by 40 percent each.  Adding insult to this injury, Henke's department judged that the nation's capital is a 'low-risk' city and that the Statue of Liberty, Brooklyn Bridge and Empire State Building are not worthy of "national icon" status. By contrast, those terrorism magnets of Kansas City and St. Louis—both by happenstance in Henke's home state of Missouri—received boosts in funds. Other winners: the horses of Louisville, the cattle of Omaha and five cities in Jeb Bush's Florida."

U.S. Rep. Peter T. King (R-NY) said of the incident: "Tracy Henke had to leave the department. Very simply, she did a terrible job in the decisions she made to award grant money. ... And the department realized that."  Henke's resignation was effective October 31, 2006.

Lobbying 
Upon resigning from the Department of Homeland Security, Henke immediately began work the next day as "a senior adviser at the Ashcroft Group, a Washington lobbying firm headed by her old boss, former Attorney General John Ashcroft."

According to Henke's current Ashcroft Group biography: "Tracy Henke is an expert on homeland security and justice funding and programs; assessing the legislative and policy landscape; formulating procedure and policy; top-level negotiating; and strategic planning. Henke’s career focus has given her knowledge of all sides of the budget, appropriations, and program execution process."

One of Henke's lobbying clients is the Rockefeller Family Fund, for whom she lobbied in 2009 for passage of the CLEAR Act, a cap and dividend variation of President Barack Obama's proposed cap and trade legislation to limit greenhouse gas emissions.

References

External links

United States Department of Justice officials
United States Department of Homeland Security officials
University of Missouri alumni
Living people
Year of birth missing (living people)